Mohammad Amin Bahrami (born 31 January 1997) is an Iranian goalkeeper that is currently player of
Iran national under-23 football team He started with Zob Ahan when he was youth U-19 And his currently team is Tractor Sazi F.C.

References

1997 births
Living people
Iranian footballers
Tractor S.C. players
Association football goalkeepers